A muti is a term for traditional medicine in Southern Africa.

Muti may also refer to:

People
al-Muti (914–974), Abbasid Caliph in Baghdad
Muti Randolph, Brazilian architect

Surname
Abd Allah ibn Muti (died 692), Qurayshi governor of Kufa 
Ettore Muti (1902–1943), Italian Fascist politician
Netane Muti (born 1999), Tongan-American football player
Ornella Muti (born 1955), actress
Riccardo Muti (born 1941), conductor
Tiberio Muti (1574–1636), Roman Catholic cardinal
Valeriano Muti (died 1610), Roman Catholic bishop

Places
Palazzo Muti, Rome, Italy; an historic house
Villa Muti, Frascati, Italy; a historic villa
Muti, Estonia; a village

Other uses
 Muti (film), U.S. action-thriller film

See also

 Muti Muti people, alternative name for Muthi Muthi people
 Muti Muti language, alternative name for Madhi Madhi language
 
 Mutis (disambiguation)
 Mutti (disambiguation)